Comedy mystery is a film genre combining elements of comedy and mystery fiction. Though the genre arguably peaked in the 1930s and 1940s, comedy mystery films have been continually produced since.

Below is a chronological list of comedy mystery films.

1930s 

1930
 Ghost Parade
 The Limejuice Mystery or Who Spat in Grandfather's Porridge?
 Raffles

1932
 The Crooked Circle
 Jewel Robbery
 The Penguin Pool Murder
 Strangers of the Evening

1933
Whistling in the Dark

1934
 Bulldog Drummond Strikes Back
 Death on the Diamond
 Murder on the Blackboard
 The Thin Man

1935
 Murder on a Honeymoon 
 One Frightened Night
 Star of Midnight
 Streamline Express

1936
 The Ex-Mrs. Bradford
 The Mandarin Mystery
 The Princess Comes Across
 Murder on a Bridle Path
 After the Thin Man
 Satan Met a Lady

1937
 Smart Blonde
 Fly-Away Baby
 The Adventurous Blonde

1938
 Blondes at Work
 Fast Company
 Nancy Drew... Detective
 The Lady Vanishes
 The Mad Miss Manton
 There's Always a Woman
 Tom Sawyer, Detective
 Torchy Blane in Panama
 Torchy Gets Her Man

1939
 The Cat and the Canary
 It's a Wonderful World
 Nancy Drew... Reporter
 Nancy Drew... Trouble Shooter
 Nancy Drew and the Hidden Staircase
 Torchy Blane in Chinatown
 Torchy Runs for Mayor
 Torchy Blane... Playing with Dynamite
 Another Thin Man

1940s 

1940
 His Girl Friday
 Up in the Air

1941
 Footsteps in the Dark
 Murder by Invitation
 Whistling in the Dark - better-known remake, starring Red Skelton
 Shadow of the Thin Man

1942
 A Night to Remember
 One Thrilling Night
 Whistling in Dixie
 Who Done It?

1943
 Whistling in Brooklyn

1944
 Arsenic and Old Lace
 The Case of the Screaming Bishop
 One Body Too Many
 The Thin Man Goes Home

1945
 Lady on a Train
 Scared Stiff

1946
 Dangerous Money

1947
 The Chinese Ring
 Song of the Thin Man

1948
 Docks of New Orleans
 The Golden Eye
 Shanghai Chest

1949
 Abbott and Costello Meet the Killer, Boris Karloff
 Two Knights from Brooklyn

1950s 

1953
 Scared Stiff

1954
 The Runaway Bus

1955
 The Trouble With Harry

1960s 

1960
 Crimen
 Inspector Palmu's Mistake

1963
 Charade
 The Pink Panther

1964
 A Shot in the Dark

1965
 That Darn Cat!

1967
 Catalina Caper

1970s 

1971
 Do Not Fold, Spindle or Mutilate

1973
 The Adventure of Sherlock Holmes' Smarter Brother

1974
 Return of the Pink Panther

1975
 The Black Bird
 One of Our Dinosaurs Is Missing

1976
 Murder By Death
 Peeper
 The Pink Panther Strikes Again
 Silver Streak

1977
 High Anxiety
 The Late Show

1978
 The Big Fix
 The Cheap Detective
 Foul Play
 Revenge of the Pink Panther

1980s 

1980
 The Private Eyes

1982
 Dead Men Don't Wear Plaid
 Deathtrap
 Trail of the Pink Panther

1983
 Curse of the Pink Panther

1984
 Bianca

1985
 Clue
 Desperately Seeking Susan
 Fletch

1986
 The Great Mouse Detective

1987 
 Forever, Lulu
 Outrageous Fortune

1988
 Sunset
 Who Framed Roger Rabbit

1989
 The 'Burbs
 Fletch Lives
 Who’s Harry Crumb

1990s 

1990
 Off and Running

1992
 Once Upon a Crime

1993
 Manhattan Murder Mystery
 So I Married an Axe Murderer

1994
 Ace Ventura: Pet Detective
 Radioland Murders

1995
 Ace Ventura: When Nature Calls

1996
 Harriet the Spy

1997
 Zero Effect

1998
 Where's Marlowe?

1999
 Safe House

2000s 

2000
 Phantom of the Megaplex 
 Trixie

2001
 Head over Heels
 Recess: School's Out

2002
 Get a Clue
 Scooby-Doo

2003
 Looney Tunes: Back in Action

2004
 Scooby-Doo 2: Monsters Unleashed

2005
 Hoodwinked
 Kiss Kiss Bang Bang

2006
 The Pink Panther

2007
 Nancy Drew

2009
 Mystery Team
 The Pink Panther 2
 Scooby-Doo! The Mystery Begins
 Sherlock Holmes

2010s 

2010
 One Hundred Years of Evil
 Tom and Jerry Meet Sherlock Holmes

2011
 A Ghost of a Chance
 Seniors
 Sherlock Holmes: A Game of Shadows

2012
 Ace Attorney

2014
 Agatha Raisin and the Quiche of Death

2015
 Hero

2016
 The Nice Guys
 Zootopia

2018
 Sherlock Gnomes
 A Simple Favor

2019
 Murder Mystery
 Knives Out

See also
 Lists of films
 Buffoon
 Slapstick comedy

References

Mystery